Bellefountain Bridge is located east of Tracy, Iowa, United States. In 1898 the Mahaska Board of Supervisors contracted with the Clinton Bridge Company of Clinton, Iowa to design and build a new bridge for $9,750. It replaced a ferry service that operated in the small town of  Bellefountain. The Pratt through truss span was completed in 1898. Its deck has subsequently deteriorated and the bridge has been closed to traffic. The bridge was listed on the National Register of Historic Places in 1998.

References

Bridges completed in 1898
Bridges in Mahaska County, Iowa
Truss bridges in Iowa
National Register of Historic Places in Mahaska County, Iowa
Road bridges on the National Register of Historic Places in Iowa
Pratt truss bridges in the United States